Empire Line may refer to:
 Empire silhouette style of women's dresses
 Empire Corridor rail line in New York State
 Empire Service (train), an Amtrak service which that uses the line
 Imperial Line, a flight route of the Italian national airline Ala Littoria between 1935 and 1941
 "Empire Line", a song by The National from Sleep Well Beast